The 2003 Samsung-PBA Reinforced Conference Finals, for sponsorship reasons was the best-of-7 basketball championship series of the 2003 PBA Reinforced Conference and the conclusion of the conference's playoffs. The San Miguel Beermen and Coca Cola Tigers played for the 86th championship contested by the league.

After two runner-up finishes in the first two conferences, the Coca Cola Tigers won their 2nd PBA title with a 4–3 series victory over San Miguel Beermen.

Series scoring summary

Games summary

Game 1

The Beermen bucked the absence of Kwan Johnson and leaned on Danny Ildefonso down the stretch, Ildefonso scored 11 of his team's last 15 points and stole the ball from Coca Cola import Tee McClary with four seconds remaining as the Beermen escaped with a thrilling victory. SMB import Kwan Johnson spent the entire fourth period on the bench after hurting his left groin late in the third quarter. Rudy Hatfield and McClary joined forces in a 19–6 Tigers' run that cut the Beermen's 14-point lead to just one, 79–80, with barely a minute remaining.

Game 2

With the score at 62–43 in Coca Cola's favor, Tigers' import Tee McClary planted an elbow on Beerman Danny Ildefonso's side during a deadball situation in the third quarter, prompting the latter to retaliate with a close-fist assault, both players were thrown out of the ballgame. McClary and Ildefonso were suspended in the following game of the finals series for figuring in a fight.

Game 3

Dondon Hontiveros stepped up in the absence of San Miguel import Kwan Johnson and Danny Ildefonso, the cebuano hotshot pumped in 13 of his team-high 22 points in the fourth quarter as the Beermen went through several deadlocks before putting the sting out of the importless Tigers. The Beermen brought in Cedric Ceballos, a last-minute replacement for the injured Johnson on a temporary basis, the NBA's 1992 slam dunk contest champion tossed in 11 points and hauled down 10 rebounds in 38 minutes of action.

Game 4

The Tigers led, 73–62, entering the fourth quarter when Danny Ildefonso and Dorian Peña rallied the Beermen and gave them an 82–81 edge after a long scoreless spell by the Tigers, Rudy Hatfield nailed a triple with 49 seconds left that broke an 84-all deadlock and Hatfield, who scored 16 points with 16 rebounds, capped his heroics with a block on Dondon Hontiveros' potential game-tying three-pointer at the buzzer to preserved the Tigers' win.

Game 5

Rob Wainwright scored 11 of his 14 points in the fourth quarter and along with Jeffrey Cariaso, stole the thunder from import Tee McClary as they spearheaded the Tigers' offensive in the payoff period that opened an 85–79 spread for the Tigers with less than two minutes remaining. SMB import Kwan Johnson, who return from a groin injury, flubbed a go-ahead triple in the final 21 seconds and saw his drive at the buzzer rim out, allowing the Tigers to escaped with a two-point victory.

Game 6

Game 7

The Tigers were up, 65–59, entering the final quarter. Tee McClary scored 11 of his 25 points in the fourth period and pounced on those eight turnovers by the Beermen as Coca Cola got their biggest lead of the game at 85–70 with 5:45 left, the Beermen countered with a 12–2 surge to trim the deficit to 82–87 with 1:39 remaining.

Rosters

Broadcast notes

References

External links
PBA.ph

2003
San Miguel Beermen games
Powerade Tigers games
2003 PBA season
PBA Reinforced Conference Finals
PBA Reinforced Conference Finals